Nogometni klub Središče ob Dravi or simply NK Središče is a Slovenian football club which play in the town of Središče ob Dravi. The team competes in the Ptuj Super League, the fourth highest league in the Slovenian football system. The club was founded in 1977.

Honours
Slovenian Fourth Division
 Winners: 2001–02

Slovenian Fifth Division
 Winners: 2010–11, 2011–12, 2021–22

Slovenian Sixth Division
 Winners: 2006–07

League history since 1991

References

Association football clubs established in 1977
Football clubs in Slovenia
1977 establishments in Slovenia